Mokgabo Onneile Thanda (born 3 April 1993) is a Motswana footballer who plays as a midfielder for Zambian club Yasa FC and the Botswana women's national team.

Club career
Thanda has played for Yasa in Zambia.

International career
Thanda capped for Botswana at senior level during two COSAFA Women's Championship editions (2020 and 2021).

See also
List of Botswana women's international footballers

References

External links

1993 births
Living people
People from Central District (Botswana)
Botswana women's footballers
Women's association football midfielders
Botswana women's international footballers
Botswana expatriate women's footballers
Botswana expatriate sportspeople in Zambia
Expatriate women's footballers in Zambia